Montaigne is a historic house in Natchez, Adams County, Mississippi.

Location
It is located on Liberty Road in Natchez, Mississippi.

History
The mansion was built in 1855 for General William T. Martin (1823-1910).

During the American Civil War of 1861–1865, the mansion was ravaged by Northerners and slaves, who smashed the chandeliers and cut the furniture to use it as firewood. However, after the war, Gen. Martin restored it, adding Chippendale furniture, wallpaper by Zuber & Cie, and Egyptian marble mantelpieces.

The garden spans 23 acres.

It has been added to the National Register of Historic Places since December 11, 1974.

Gallery

References

External links

Houses on the National Register of Historic Places in Mississippi
Houses in Natchez, Mississippi
Houses completed in 1855
National Register of Historic Places in Natchez, Mississippi